Filmography for the actress Mary Astor:

Silent films: 1920–1929

Sound films: 1929–1964

External links

Astor, Mary
Astor, Mary